Østerdalen is a valley and traditional district in Innlandet county, in Eastern Norway. This area typically is described as the large Glåma river valley as well as all its tributary valleys. It includes the municipalities Rendalen, Alvdal, Folldal, Tynset, Tolga and Os in the north, Elverum, Stor-Elvdal, Engerdal, Trysil and Åmot in the south. It historically included Särna and Idre, which is now in Sweden.

Geography
Østerdalen is quite wide in most places. Østerdalen is characterized by tranquil landscapes and rounded mountains. The lower valley is mostly covered by pine forests and more rolling hills. Typical of Østerdalen is that large parts of the forest floor are covered with reindeer moss, a variety of lichen. Further up in the valley has higher mountains and less forests and more farming areas.

Glomma valley 

The main valley that runs through Østerdalen is the Glommadal (or Glåmdalen). The valley is formed by the river Glåma (also called the Glomma), which is the longest and largest river in Norway. From Lake Aursund in the north and south to Elverum, the valley is called the Østerdalen. From that point south until Kongsvinger, it is referred to as Solør. As it turns westerly from Kongsvinger until Nes, it is called the Odalen valley. These designations are also traditional districts, reflecting the designations locals used for their valleys. The upper river valleys of Norwegian rivers have distinctive names which are vestiges of earlier cultural distinctions such as building styles, traditional clothing or bunad and domestic crafts.

Etymology 
The name was referring to the valleys of the rivers Glomma, Rena, Trysilelva, and Österdalälven (the parishes Idre and Särna belonged to Norway until 1644). The modern form ends in -dalen which is the finite singular of the word dal which means "dale" or "valley".

References

Districts of Innlandet
Valleys of Innlandet